The Skyrocket is a 1926 American silent romantic drama film directed by Marshall Neilan and starring  Peggy Hopkins Joyce. The film was based on the 1925 novel of the same name by Adela Rogers St. Johns and scripted by Benjamin Glazer.

Cast

Production
Peggy Hopkins Joyce was a one-time Ziegfeld Follies showgirl who became a media figure in the late 1910s and early 1920s for dating, marrying, and divorcing wealthy men, acquiring a sizable collection of expensive jewellery and furs and wearing fashionable clothes. The Skyrocket was Joyce's first full-length feature and was intended as a vehicle to launch her acting career as she was largely known only for her colorful personal life. The film's distributor, Associated Exhibitors, launched a massive publicity campaign to promote the film. While Joyce earned mainly positive reviews for her performance, the film barely earned back its budget in box office returns. She would appear in only one more film, International House (1933), before fading into obscurity.

Preserrvation
No prints of The Skyrocket are located in any film archives, making it a lost film.

See also
List of lost films

References

External links

 
 

1926 films
1926 romantic drama films
American romantic drama films
American silent feature films
American black-and-white films
Films about actors
Films based on American novels
Films directed by Marshall Neilan
American independent films
Lost American films
Films based on works by Adela Rogers St. Johns
1920s independent films
Associated Exhibitors films
Lost romantic drama films
1920s American films
Silent romantic drama films
Silent American drama films